Gene Smith is an American college administrator and former college football player and coach who currently serves as senior vice president and Athletic Director for Ohio State University.

He was named the university's eighth athletic director on March 5, 2005. Prior to his tenure at Ohio State, he served as athletic director for Arizona State, Eastern Michigan, and Iowa State.

Early life/playing and coaching career
A native of Cleveland, Ohio, Smith played defensive end for four years at Notre Dame including the 1973 Notre Dame Fighting Irish football team that won the AP National Championship.  He graduated from Notre Dame in 1977, becoming the first member of his family to graduate from college.  That year, he became an assistant coach of the Fighting Irish football team, which would go on to win the Undisputed National Championship.

Athletic director positions
 1986–1993, Eastern Michigan University
 1993–2000, Iowa State University
 2000–2005, Arizona State University
 2005–current, Ohio State University

Administrative career
He was also identified as one of Black Enterprise's "50 most powerful African-Americans in sports". He has previous affiliations with the NCAA Management Council, the NCAA committee on Infractions, the Rose Bowl Management Committee, and the NCAA Football Rules Committee. Smith was named to the NCAA Men's Division I Basketball Committee in 2006 and became the chair in 2010.

In January 2014 Smith was promoted to senior vice president of the university. He will continue in his duties as athletic director, while also having an expanding role in other areas of the university.

In 2020–21, Smith was in his 16th year as director of athletics at The Ohio State University. He is widely recognized among the leaders of his profession and has been named "one of the most powerful people in collegiate sport." Smith was named the Buckeyes' director of athletics March 5, 2005 and was elevated to senior vice president and Wolfe Foundation endowed athletics director in May 2016.

Smith is the eighth person to hold the athletics director position at Ohio State. He previously served as director of athletics at Arizona State, Iowa State and Eastern Michigan universities and is entering his 33rd year in the role.

The Ohio State department of athletics sponsors 36 fully-funded varsity sports with more than 1.000 student-athletes competing for Big Ten Conference and NCAA championships.

In 2019–20, Ohio State had a record 647 Ohio State Scholar Athletes and 457 Academic All-Big Ten selections and 257 student-athletes earned their degrees.

During Smith’s tenure, Ohio State has dominated Big Ten Conference play, with 105 team and 331 individual conference championships. In addition, more than 90 percent of graduating seniors earned jobs, enrolled in graduate school or moved on to professional sports

On the national stage, Ohio State teams have won 24 team and 104 individual national championships during Smith’s tenure and collected 1,586 All-America honors. By doing so, Ohio State has established itself as a perennial Top 5 contender in the Learfield Director’s Cup.

Record setting third party agreements – with NIKE, IMG, LEVY and COKE, among others – have allowed for innovative and trend setting programs offered to student-athletes.

The new Eugene D. Smith Leadership Institute – funded by private support – provides leadership, character and career development for all Ohio State student-athletes in order to best prepare them for life after graduation. Institute programs include: Bucks Go Pro internships, job shadows/micro-internships, Buckeye Road Trip, career fairs, Sundays in The Shoe, and Lead Like a Buckeye, among others.

Along with his development team, Smith has recently raised more than $130 million for the construction of the Schumaker Complex, Covelli Arena and Ty Tucker Tennis Center and a renovation at the Woody Hayes Athletic Center – the Wandell Family Player’s Suite. Next on Smith’s agenda is completion of fundraising for a new lacrosse stadium, another addition to the growing Athletics District.

Smith’s duties extend beyond the athletics department, with Business Advancement also reporting to him. Business Advancement comprises the Schottenstein Center, Nationwide Arena, Trademark & Licensing, Affinity Agreements, Drake Event Center, Blackwell Inn and Fawcett Center. Smith’s team has increased revenues through innovation, collaboration and operational efficiencies.

Smith oversees a total of 525 employees in athletics and business advancement, with an annual budget of $300 million, and a football program with a $1.5 billion valuation, as estimated by the Wall Street Journal. But what Smith is most proud of is the exemplary culture within his units, recognized by Forbes as “one of the best ten organizations to work for in sports” and the only college program on its list.

Smith currently serves on the Boards of Directors of the Columbus Sports Commission, Columbus Cub, Columbus Arena Management and Columbus Museum of Art.

Smith is the father of four children with his wife, Sheila: Matt, Nicole, Lindsey and Summer, and they are grandparents to seven: Marshall, Steele, Addison, Grayson, Tyson, Elijah and Maya. Outside of work Smith enjoys travel, golf and spending time with family.

Awards and honors

Player
 1973 AP National Championship (with Notre Dame)

Coach
 1977 Undisputed National Championship (as an assistant coach with Notre Dame)

Administrator
 Nine NCAA National Championships in various sports (as OSU athletic director)
 2010 Carl Maddox Sport Management Award
 2016 James J. Corbett Memorial Award

References

External links
 Ohio State profile

Year of birth missing (living people)
Living people
African-American college athletic directors in the United States
Arizona State Sun Devils athletic directors
Eastern Michigan Eagles athletic directors
Iowa State Cyclones athletic directors
Ohio State Buckeyes athletic directors
Notre Dame Fighting Irish football players
Sportspeople from Cleveland
College Football Playoff Selection Committee members
21st-century African-American people
Players of American football from Cleveland